Demonica is the first compilation album by Polish extreme metal band Behemoth. The boxset includes demos plus previously unreleased and re-recorded songs from Behemoth's "old school" days when they still played traditional black metal.

The boxset is limited to 10,000 copies and comes packed as an exclusive A5 digibook/slipcase with a 44-page book including rare photos and lyrics. It is also known that a limited edition gatefold double vinyl pressing was released, which is limited to 525 copies. It was re-released as a digipack containing all the original liner notes and lyrics from the box set through the band's current Metal Blade label in 2011.

Track listing
CD 1

CD 2

Personnel

CD 1

 Tracks 1-8
 Adam "Nergal" Darski – guitars, bass and vocals
 Adam "Baal Ravenlock" Muraszko – drums and percussion
 Additional effects and synth by Robert "Rob Darken" Fudali
 Tracks 9-10
 Adam "Nergal" – rhythm & acoustic guitars, bass and vocals
 Adam "Baal Ravenlock" Muraszko – drums and percussion
 Track 11
 Adam "Nergal" – lead & rhythm guitars, all vocals
 Zbigniew Robert "Inferno" Promiński – drums and percussion
 Tomasz "Orion" Wróblewski – bass

CD 2

 Tracks 1-11
 Adam "Nergal" Darski – lead & rhythm guitars, all vocals
 Adam "Baal Ravenlock" Muraszko – drums and percussion
 Rafał "Frost / Browar" Brauer – lead & rhythm guitars
 Orcus – session bass
 Track 12
 Adam "Nergal" Darski – lead & rhythm guitars, all vocals
 Zbigniew Robert "Inferno" Promiński – drums and percussion
 Tomasz "Orion" Wróblewski – bass
 All tracks re-mastered by Grzegorz Piwkowski at High-End Studio, September 2005.

Release history

References

Behemoth (band) compilation albums
2006 compilation albums
Regain Records compilation albums